The Jaguar XK is the second and final generation of the Jaguar XK 2+2 grand tourer manufactured and marketed by British automobile manufacturer Jaguar Cars under the X150 internal designation. The three-door fastback coupé debuted at the 2005 Frankfurt Motor Show with the 4.2-litre V8 engine of its predecessor, and the two-door convertible debuted in 2006 at the North American International Auto Show.

The X150 is noted for its all-aluminium construction and its styling by Ian Callum, with details evoking
prominent earlier Jaguar models, e.g., the Sayer nose recalling the XP/11 sports racing prototype of 1953 and adopted for the D-type – and the grill located badge recalling the E-type.

A facelifted XK was launched in 2009 with a new 5.0-litre V8. The production of the XK ended in July 2014 without a replacement model with a total production just under 54,000 units.

Overview 

The X150's design was completed in 2002 and was previewed by Advanced Lightweight Coupé (ALC) which was first seen at the 2005 North American International Auto Show. The designer, Ian Callum, was also responsible for the Aston Martin DB7 and Vanquish grand tourers. The X150's grille is inspired by that of the 1961 E-Type. Introduced in the market in 2006, the X150 has a bonded and riveted aluminium monocoque chassis shared with the XJ and uses an all-aluminium construction. The X150 was the second Jaguar automobile assembled at the newly acquired Castle Bromwich plant alongside the XJ saloon. The X150, as compared to the X100 is  wider and is  longer. It is also  lighter than the X100 due to its aluminium construction resulting in performance and fuel consumption improvements. The 4.2-litre V8 engine was carried over from its predecessor and is mated to a 6-speed automatic transmission manufactured by ZF Friedrichshafen. Like the X100, the X150 has wood trim on the interior offered as standard equipment, however it is much subdued from the X100 wood trim. A notable feature on the interior was steering column mounted shift paddles for easier gear changes. A more powerful XKR version having a supercharged variant of the engine was introduced in 2007. Aesthetic differences as compared to the XK include four-way dual exhausts, redesigned front bumper and hood louvres for improved engine airflow, and distinctive Jaguar “R” logos and badges in the interior and exterior.

The X150 convertible shares the same engine options as the coupé and features a conventional cloth top that requires 18 seconds for operation.

The XK received a facelift in 2009,
with minor alterations to front and rear lights and bumper designs, together with the introduction of a new 5.0-litre V8 for both the naturally aspirated XK and the supercharged XKR. The interior also received some changes, in particular the introduction of the XF style rotary gear selector mated to the new ZF automatic transmission. The XK received a second and more minor facelift in 2011 with new front bumper and light design,
which was presented at the New York Auto Show.

Specifications

Engines

Note: All AJ-V8 Gen III V8 engines, and the Jaguar XKR-S engine, are SAE rated.

Transmission
All 4.2-litre models were fitted with a six-speed ZF 6HP26 automatic transmission with Jaguar Sequential Shift and J-gate gear selector. All 5.0-litre models were fitted with a six-speed ZF 6HP28 and the JaguarDrive rotary gear selector.

2011 facelift

In March 2011, on the launch of the XKR-S at the Geneva Motor Show, Jaguar revealed the details of a facelift for the 2012 XK MY. The new specification included front and rear styling changes and internal trim changes with navigation system and a backup camera included as standard equipment.

In addition to standard XK and XKR, the revised body shape formed the basis for the following models.

XK and XKR Special Edition
The XK and XKR Special editions were unveiled exclusively for the European and the UK markets. They include the use of tactile 'scraffito' finished leather on the front seats, instrument binnacle, door and rear quarter casings; Poltrona Frau leather headlinings with Shadow Walnut and Dark Figured Aluminium veneer, 525W Bowers & Wilkins sound system, 16 by 16 way adjustable heated Performance seats, a heated steering wheel and keyless entry/start, choice of Celestial Black, with Crystal Blue, Lunar Grey, Polaris White, Rhodium Silver and Ultimate Black body colour; two new 20-inch alloy wheel options (Venom, Orona).

XKR-S

Unveiled at the 2011 Geneva Motor Show, the XKR-S is a high performance version of the XKR.

XK Dynamic R, XK Signature (2014)
The XK Dynamic R was a 'run out' version of the XKR with the Black Dynamic Pack and included stiffer suspension, a 10 mm ride height drop and bodykit extensions from the Speed Pack.

The XK Signature is a special version of the XK with the V8 engine tuned to  along with 20-inch Kalimnos alloy wheels (optional 20-inch Takoba), diamond-quilted leather upholstery, Canvas Suede cloth headlining, Figured Ebony veneers, leather seat in Ivory or Charcoal, reversing camera, metal sports pedals.

Limited editions

XKR-S GT (2013)

The XKR-S GT is a limited (30 units in United States and Canada, 10 units in the UK; worldwide production was 45 units) version of XKR-S coupé. Technical highlights included a six-speed transmission, active electronic differential, bespoke aerodynamic components and suspension developments to increase downforce and optimised high-speed cornering ability (a wider front track, increased camber, revised bushings, a new steering system and faster steering ratio, height-adjustable and bespoke adaptive dampers with twin spring system and increased rates of 68% at the front and 25% at the rear), a carbon ceramic brake system (398 mm and 380 mm front/rear discs, 6/4-piston front/rear monoblock calipers)

The car was unveiled by Jaguar in 2013 at the New York International Auto Show, followed by the 2013 Goodwood Festival of Speed.

Delivery to UK customers commenced in October 2013.

Final Fifty (2014)
Jaguar announced a special limited edition to mark the end of XK production. Only 50 were sold, all in the US. The Final Fifty is based on the XKR with Dynamic Pack. The exterior is identifiable by an extra-louvered hood inspired by the XKR-S GT, "Vortex" 20-inch wheels, a rear wing, side sill extensions, and a rear diffuser. The Final Fifty cars are split evenly in 25 coupe and 25 convertible body styles and all cars were fitted with a commemorative plaque signed by the then Jaguar's chief designer Ian Callum.

Models

Transmission
All 5.0 models are fitted with a six-speed ZF 6HP28 automatic transmission and the JaguarDrive rotary gear selector.

Special models

XKR Portfolio (2008)

The 2008 XKR Portfolio is a version of the XKR developed by Jaguar's Special Vehicles team and Alcon, it is often incorrectly referred to as a 2007 model due to being built and first sold in 2007. It includes 400 mm diameter front and 350 mm rear brake discs, six-piston front calipers and four-piston rear calipers, 20-inch five-spoke BBS wheels, power vents, a Celestial Black body colour (optional Liquid Silver for UK and Switzerland models), Engine-Spun aluminium veneer or optional Satin American Walnut veneer, an alloy and leather gearshift selector, soft-grab door handles, contrast stitching throughout the cabin, leather-edged mats with Jaguar logos, Portfolio treadplates on the doorsills and a 525 W Premium Audio system with Dolby Pro Logic II surround sound system by Bowers & Wilkins.

XKR-S (2009)

The XKR-S is a limited production (200 units) version of the XKR coupé for the European market, 50 units were built in RHD for the UK, 150 units were built in LHD, it was not sold outside of the UK or EU. It was a 2009 model year vehicle but built in 2008. The additional performance was achieved through improved aerodynamics (reduced drag and lift) and a revised suspension set-up. Other changes include an S Alcon R Performance braking system with 400 mm diameter front and 350 mm rear brake discs, six-piston front calipers and four-piston rear calipers, recalibrated suspension, Ultimate Black body colour, XKR-S badging on the rear of the car, a 10 mm lower ride height, 20-inch Vortex forged alloy wheels with bespoke tyres, an active exhaust system, leather upholstery with Charcoal with Ivory twin-needle contrast stitching, Piano Black veneer and a Charcoal Alston luxury headliner.

The car was unveiled at the 2008 Geneva Motor Show and later shown at the 2008 Paris Motor Show. The production version went on sale in the Summer of 2008.

This special edition (with a 4.2-litre V8 engine) should not be confused with the later introduced 2012 XKR-S featuring a 5.0-litre V8 engine, which was launched in 2011.

XK60 (2008)
The XK60 is a special version of the XK for the UK market built to commemorate the 60th anniversary of the XK120. Notable changes include 20-inch Senta alloy wheels, a sporty alloy gear knob and selector-gate surround, plus distinctive body enhancements: a new front spoiler and rear valance panel, chrome-finished side vents along with bright upper and lower front grille meshes, special tailpipe finishes and appliqués on both sides of the car.

XKR 'Goodwood Special' (2009)
Based on the standard XKR, the XKR 'Goodwood Special' is a prototype designed to explore the sportier side of the XKR's character and allow Jaguar's engineering team to extend performance boundaries.
The car featured a louder exhaust, 21-inch alloy wheels and a lowered ride-height as well as a Lime Green body colour and satin graphite detailing on the front grilles, headlights, door mirrors, side window surrounds, rear signature blade and bonnet louvres.

XKR 75 Goodwood LE (2010)
Unveiled at the 2010 Goodwood Festival of Speed, the XKR 75 Goodwood LE is a limited production (75 units, 20 RHD and 55 LHD) version of the XKR commemorating the company's 75th anniversary. It also features an upgraded torque converter, upgraded suspension, an aerodynamic body pack with body coloured finish for the front splitter, side sills extensions and rear diffuser, body coloured larger rear spoiler and rear trunk lid finish; sports exhaust with improved performance and acoustics, Stratus Grey exterior paint with optional graphics pack; red brake callipers, 20-inch Vortex forged lightweight alloy wheels, XKR performance interior in Charcoal and Ivory stitch leather with Jet suede cloth headlining with XKR 75 tread plate and active front lighting. The car was tuned and calibrated in partnership with the RSR engineering team.

UK models went on sale in July 2010 with delivery in October of the same year.

XKR 175 (2010)
Unveiled at the Monterey Jet Center during the Pebble Beach Automotive Weekend, the XKR 175 is a limited production version of the XKR for the North American market, built to commemorate the company's 75th anniversary.

A total of 175 cars were exported to the US, as well as another 15 to Canada.

XK E-Type 50th Anniversary Edition (2011)
Commissioned by Jaguar Italy, the Italian dealer of Jaguar Cars, the XK E-Type Anniversary Edition was a limited production variant of the XK built to commemorate the 50th anniversary of the E-Type. Unveiled in 2011, the car features special Black Cherry Colour along with a black bonnet and 19-inch Tamana heritage alloy wheels with red Jaguar badging. Other exterior features include chrome bits on the front grille, wing mirrors, air intakes and window surrounds. The interior featured unique upholstery in Ivory and Charcoal leather along with a special "Jaguar Heritage" logo on the headrest, and aluminium inserts in "Engine Spin" finish. All of the 50 customers purchasing the cars were given an opportunity to drive the E-Type for one week.

Also in other countries this XK E-Type Anniversary Edition (E50) was sold to customers in limited volume. In Switzerland 50 units of XK E50 edition cars were sold, 25 coupés and 25 convertibles.

The XK E50 cars have an additional "E50" badge on the left side of the boot lid, just below the standard "XK" badge.

XK and XKR Poltrona Frau (2011)
The Poltrona Frau was a special trim level exclusive to the UK and European markets on the XK and the XKR with Poltrona Frau leather upholstery in "scraffito" finish – including the door panels, headliner, seats and dashboard.

The edition was offered in navy blue or truffle brown with aluminium or walnut wood trim along with heated sports seats, a 525-watt Bowers and Wilkins sound system, unique sill plates, stainless-steel pedals, choice of two 20-inch wheels, six special interior colours and four soft top colours (for the convertible).

Production and worldwide Sales 
Production of the XK began in early 2006 and ended in July 2014 without a replacement model.

Total sales are from 2009. The sales figures for 2015 and 2016 consist of dealer stocks.

Awards

The XK won the Top Gear magazine "GT of the Year" and "Car of the Year" awards in 2006.
It was also awarded the Engineering and Technology Award at the Prince Michael International Road Safety Awards in London.
The convertible version made the Top Gear cool wall under sub zero.

References

External links

Jaguar XK  at Jaguar's global website
XK eBrochure: 2010, 2012
Press kits
MY2012: XK, XKR-S Convertible, XKR-S

XK
Grand tourers
Rear-wheel-drive vehicles
Convertibles
Coupés
2010s cars
Cars introduced in 2006
2+2 coupés

fr:Jaguar XK#Jaguar XKR